Polia Chentoff or Polina Chentova (1896-1933) was a Russian artist, known for her paintings, sculptures and book illustrations, who spent a large part of her career in Paris and London.

Biography
Polia Chentoff was born in 1896 in Vicebsk in the Russian Empire in the family of Jewish shopkeeper Abram Chentoff, and, after first moving to Moscow, studied art at the Royal Academy of Fine Arts in Brussels. She subsequently moved to Paris where she exhibited works at the Paris Salon and illustrated a number of children's books for a Berlin publisher. After returning to Moscow for some years, Chentoff moved to London in the late 1920s where she continued to exhibit her paintings and sculptures. She had solo exhibitions at several commercial galleries, including the Paul Guillaume and Brandon Davis galleries, she also showed woodcuts and engravings at the Bloomsbury Gallery during June 1930. In 1932 Chentoff married the artist Edmond Xavier Kapp but died, in London, the following year from a cerebral tumour.

References

1896 births
1933 deaths
20th-century Russian women artists
People from Vitebsk
Russian women painters
Russian women sculptors